Ignacio Guadalupe Martínez Martán (13 March 1960) known professionally as Ignacio Guadalupe is a Mexican film, television and stage actor.

Early life
Guadalupe was born in Naco, Sonora on 13 March 1960. He moved to Mexico City where he studied Communication studies at the National Autonomous University of Mexico and Acting at the Centro Universitario de Teatro.

Career
Guadalupe debuted as an actor in the television series Mein Freund Winnetou in 1980. He later made his film debut in Vidas errantes, he was nominated for an Ariel Award for Best Actor and won a Diosas de Plata Award for Best Newcomer for his performance in the film. Besides this, he also worked as a writer for the television show La hora marcada.

In 1990, Guadalupe participated in Pueblo de madera, his performance earned him a nomination for the Ariel Award for Best Supporting Actor.

Since, Guadalupe has acted mainly in television, participating in telenovelas and TV series, but also in films: most notably in The Three Burials of Melquiades Estrada in 2005 and For Greater Glory in 2012.

Filmography

Film

Television

Awards and nominations

Ariel Awards
Guadalupe has twice been nominated for an Ariel Award, awarded by the Mexican Academy of Film.

References

External links
 

1960 births
Living people
Mexican male film actors
20th-century Mexican male actors
21st-century Mexican male actors
Mexican male stage actors
National Autonomous University of Mexico alumni
Male actors from Sonora
People from Naco Municipality